Kingdom Bank Limited, commonly referred to as Kingdom Bank, is a Christian bank in the United Kingdom. They provide deposit accounts, mortgages, and insurance brokering, with the vision of helping UK churches to grow. The Bank’s range of products is designed to help individuals and organisations steward their finances for the growth of God’s Kingdom and support Gospel Ministries with property projects.

History

It was founded in the early 1950s by Pastor George Oldershaw as an informal fund to finance the development of churches within the Assemblies of God movement in Great Britain and Ireland.  In 1954 the fund became a Registered Charity known as Assemblies of God Property Trust. The organisation saw slow but steady growth and was authorised by the Bank of England in the 1980s and subsequently by the Financial Services Authority.

On 1 January 2005 Kingdom Bank Limited was launched as a wholly owned subsidiary of the Assemblies of God Property Trust.

In May 2009, Kingdom Bank expanded its insurance business by purchasing the insurance business of Stewardship, a Christian charity. Kingdom Bank Insurance Brokering is primarily designed for Churches and Christian charities.

In September 2019, Kingdom Bank announced that the Assemblies of God Property Trust intended to allow Stewardship, with a group of Christian philanthropists, to purchase the bank.  The deal was approved by the regulators and confirmed in March 2020.  With a shared passion to see churches, charities and Christian workers thrive, this new, shared ownership, has positioned the Bank towards future growth.

External links
 Website of Kingdom Bank Limited

See also
 List of banks in the United Kingdom

References

British companies established in 2005
Banks established in 2005
Banks of the United Kingdom
Christianity and society in the United Kingdom
Companies based in Nottinghamshire
Rushcliffe